José Manuel Cabral Dias Bolieiro (born 23 June 1965) is a Portuguese Social Democratic Party (PSD) politician, serving as the President of the Regional Government of the Azores since the 2020 election. As holder of that office, he is also a member of the Council of State.

Early political carrer

He graduated in law from the University of Coimbra. From 1998 to 2009 he was a member of the Legislative Assembly of the Azores, and served as his party's leader within it. He was the president of the municipal assembly in Povoação from 2002 to 2009, and then the deputy mayor of Ponta Delgada until 2012 when he took the mayoralty. He resigned to concentrate on leading his party in the 2020 regional election.

President of the Government of the Azores

In the 2020 regional election, the PSD came second to the Socialist Party of incumbent president Vasco Cordeiro, but gained a majority after forming a government with the CDS – People's Party and the People's Monarchist Party, with support from Chega and the Liberal Initiative.

References

1965 births
Living people
People from São Miguel Island
University of Coimbra alumni
Social Democratic Party (Portugal) politicians
Mayors of places in Portugal
Members of the Legislative Assembly of the Azores
Presidents of the Government of the Azores